Stettin was a  cargo ship which was built in 1923 for the Stettiner Dampfer Compagnie. In 1930 she was sold to Norddeutscher Lloyd and renamed Akka. She was requisitioned by the Kriegsmarine in 1940. Akka was seized as a war prize in 1945, passing to the Ministry of War Transport (MoWT) and being renamed Empire Calder.

She was sold in 1947 to the Near East Shipping Co and renamed Israel Gotesman and then Isgo. In 1950 she was sold to Karl Gross, Bremen and renamed Erich. In 1960, she was sold to Palomba & Salvatori, Italy and renamed Pantera, serving until she was scrapped in 1970.

Description
The ship was built by Stettiner Oderwerke AG, Stettin for Stettiner Dampfer Compagnie AG.

She was launched in 1923, and completed in 1924.

She had a GRT of 2,646 and a NRT of 1,511. The engine was built by Stettiner Oderwerke AG.

History
Stettin was built for Stettiner Dampfer Compagnie AG, Stettin. She was operated under the management of Deutsche Levante Linie. Her code letters were JBGK and her port of registry was Stettin. In 1930, she was sold to Norddeutscher Lloyd and renamed Akka. Her port of registry was changed to Bremen and she remained under the management of Deutsche Levant Linie AG. In 1934, her Code Letters were changed to DOCW. In 1935, she was sold to Atlas Levant Linie AG. She was requisitioned by the Kriegsmarine in 1940. In 1942, Akka was allocated the German Official Number 8535 and her Code Letters were changed to SFMN.
she was damaged by mine and beached off Varangerfjord, Norway, 29 November 1942. Later refloated, repaired, returned to service.

In 1945, Akka was seized as a war prize and passed to the MoWT. She was renamed Empire Calder and placed under the management of Whimster & Co Ltd. Her port of registry was changed to London. She was allocated the United Kingdom Official Number 180787 and the Code Letters GFDY. In 1947, she was sold to the Near East Shipping Co Ltd, London. She was renamed Israel Gotesman, which was later shortened to Isgo. In 1950, she was sold to Karl Gross, Bremen and renamed Erich. In 1960, she was sold to Palomba & Salvatori, Italy and renamed Pantera, serving until she was scrapped in Italy in October 1970. With the introduction of IMO numbers, Pantera was allocated the IMO Number 5270090.

References

1923 ships
Ships built in Stettin
Ships of Norddeutscher Lloyd
Steamships of Germany
Auxiliary ships of the Kriegsmarine
Empire ships
Ministry of War Transport ships
Steamships of the United Kingdom
Merchant ships of the United Kingdom
Merchant ships of Italy
Steamships of Italy
Maritime incidents in November 1942